The olivaceous greenlet (Hylophilus olivaceus) is a species of bird in the family Vireonidae. It is found in on the eastern slope of the Andes in Ecuador and Peru. Its natural habitat is subtropical or tropical moist montane forests.

References

olivaceous greenlet
Birds of the Ecuadorian Andes
Birds of the Peruvian Andes
olivaceous greenlet
Taxonomy articles created by Polbot